César Francisco de la Peña Rentería (born 22 June 1991) is a Mexican footballer.

Club career
Once one of the young promises of Monterrey but has played only a few minutes with the first team. He made his senior team debut on October 7, 2011, as a substitute in a match against Estudiantes Tecos in a 3 - 2 win of Monterrey.
His parents Cesar de La Peña & Zulema Rentera have always supported his career since his days practising as an amateur. He was playing as amateur at Chivas AC  in San Nicolas de los Garza, Nuevo León, when he was 10 years old. He has looked a great promise since then. His nickname is "Chorri" and he has one brother, Alan de la Peña, and a sister, Zuleyma de la Peña. His father, Cesar de la Peña, is considered as his main backer since he supported his career closely since Chorri was a child.

After a short loan spell with Belén where he impressed along with fellow Monterrey loanee Julio César Cruz, de la Peña signed with Correcaminos.

References

External links
 

1991 births
Living people
Association football midfielders
C.F. Monterrey players
Liga MX players
Ascenso MX players
Liga de Balompié Mexicano players
Footballers from Nuevo León
Sportspeople from Monterrey
Mexican footballers